This is a list of seasons completed by the Stanford Cardinal men's college basketball team.

Seasons

References

Stanford Cardinals men's basketball seasons
Stanford Cardinal
Stanford Cardinal basketball seasons
Cardinal basketball